A1 Team Monaco is the Monegasque team of A1 Grand Prix, an international racing series.

Management 

On 29 August 2008, it was announced that A1 Team Monaco would be competing in season four. The joint seat holders were Hubertus Bahlsen, and former F3 and GP2 driver Clivio Piccione - who also acted as the race driver.

History

2008–09 season 

Driver: Clivio Piccione

Clivio Piccione was both a joint seat holder and the primary race driver for the team in the 2008–09 A1 Grand Prix season.

Drivers

Complete A1 Grand Prix results 
(key) "spr" indicates the Sprint Race, "fea" indicates the Feature Race.

References 

Monaco A1 team
Monegasque auto racing teams
National sports teams of Monaco
Auto racing teams established in 2008
Auto racing teams disestablished in 2009